This article is a list of the hat tricks scored by or conceded by the Canada men's national soccer team. Besides the instances of a player scoring three goals in a game, the list also includes games where a player has scored more than three goals.

The only players with multiple hat tricks in international play are Lucas Cavallini and Jonathan David, each with two hat tricks apiece.

Hat-tricks scored by Canada 
Score lists Canada first.

Hat-tricks conceded by Canada 
Score lists Canada first.

References

Canada hat-tricks
Canada hat-tricks